Aspur (also Romanized as Āspūr; also known as Aspār) is a village in Ayask Rural District, in the Central District of Sarayan County, South Khorasan Province, Iran. At the 2006 census, its population was 19, in 7 families.

References 

Populated places in Sarayan County